Toba may refer to:

Languages
 Toba Sur language, spoken in South America
 Batak Toba, spoken in Indonesia

People
 Toba people, indigenous peoples of the Gran Chaco in South America
 Toba Batak people, a sub-ethnic group of Batak people from North Sumatra, Indonesia
 Tuoba (拓拔), an early name for a clan of the Xianbei people in ancient China
 Toba Sōjō (1053–1140), Japanese astronomer and artist-monk
 Emperor Toba, emperor of Japan
 Toba Spitzer, lesbian rabbi in Arizona, USA
 Petre Tobă (born 1964), Romanian politician
 Toshimasa Toba (born 1975), Japanese footballer
 Georgian Tobă (born 1989), Romanian footballer
 Andreas Toba (born 1990), German gymnast

Places
 Toba, an area in Northern Sumatra that is now included in the Toba Samosir Regency
 Lake Toba, a lake in northern Sumatra, Indonesia, and site of the volcanic Toba eruption 75,000 years ago
 Toba catastrophe theory, according to which modern human evolution was affected by the Toba eruption
 Toba, Mie, a city in Mie prefecture, Japan
 Toba (Nova Crnja), a village near Nova Crnja, Serbia
 Toba, Tibet
 Toba, Jhelum, a village in Pakistan
 Toba Tek Singh, a district city in Punjab, Pakistan
 La Toba, central Spain

Other
 Crataegus × mordenensis 'Toba', cultivar of the Morden Hawthorn
 Japanese gunboat Toba of the 1930s–40s
 Month of Tobi, or Touba, the fifth month of the Coptic calendar
 Theatre Owners Booking Association (T.O.B.A.), a major black vaudeville circuit
 Tobă, a traditional Romanian sausage
 Torsion-Bar Antenna (TOBA), a proposed gravitational wave detector
 Istighfar, a form of repentance sometimes invoked by the word "Toba"
 Thoroughbred Owners and Breeders Association (TOBA), annually reviews/establishes Grading for Thoroughbred horse races in North America

See also

Tova (disambiguation)

Language and nationality disambiguation pages